Mulagumoodu is a town panchayat in Kanniyakumari district in the Indian state of Tamil Nadu.

Mulagumoodu comes under Kalculam taluk, Thuckalay block and Mulagumoodu town panchayat.

Demographics 
The census details of Mulagumoodu as per the 2011 Census is as follows :-

Total population - 19538  Males - 9603 Females - 9935

Population in the age group of 0-6 - 1859  Males - 968 Females - 891

Literates  - 16555  Males -  8203 Females - 8352

Scheduled Caste population  -     304  Males -142  Females - 162

Scheduled Tribe population -        10    Males - 3 Females  -  7

Total workers                        - 6960      Males -5362 Females - 1598

Main workers                        - 5953      Males - 4972 Females - 981

Cultivators                             - 121        Males - 117  Females -   4

History 
Mulagumoodu is easily derived from the word mulgu (pepper), there is indeed plenty of pepper grows in these regions.

In the Dutch book named " PATER VICTOR " Een Apostel van zuid - India(1831-1897) written by Fr.Andreas a Sta Maria, O.C.D in the year 1929,it was stated that Fr.Victor O.C.D from Belgium came to Mulagumoodu in the year 1860. It was not a catholic village, though there were some Christians. 

The year 1888 was a year of calamities for the whole Mulagumoodu and for the neighbouring areas. The people had fallen in the grip of the epidemics of Cholera.

Geography
The Pechiparai Dam water flows at Mulagumoodu via Attukulam and this water fills the following ponds which is very much useful for agriculture. In Back side Of the Church Arunangal their have  Mother Teresa Library its also called  "Annai Teresa Padipagam"

Economy
Mulagumoodu is famous for its Jack fruits. Tapioca, coconut, plantain and rubber are being cultivated by the farmers of Mulagumoodu.

Transport
Mulagumoodu-Colachel road of 8 km is the shortest road connecting NH47 to the natural harbour at Colachel. At present majority of the people of Mulagumoodu are Christians. St.Mary's church, Mulagumoodu is the Vicariate comes under the Diocese of Kuzhithurai and formerly it was under the Diocese of Kottar.St.Mary's church celebrated its 150th jubilee in the year 2010.
     
Many decades of narrow path in southern side of St.Mary's Church, Mulagumoodu has been widened as a road benefiting to the villagers of Adakachi Vilai, Arunankal, Kadan Vilai, Kallipara Vilai by connecting Fr.Victor Memorial Rock was formed on 01.05.2016, mainly by Fr.Dominic with the assistance of other fathers and parishners. The road was christened as  Fr.Victor road.

Education
1) Infant Jesus High School for girls, Mulagumoodu.

2) Infant Jesus Teacher Training Institute for women, Mulagumoodu.

3) St.Joseph's Hr.Sec.School, Mulagumoodu.

4) St.Joseph's Matriculation Hr.Sec.School, Mulagumoodu.

5) Pope John Paul II College of Education, Mulagumoodu.

6} Fr.victor Library, Mulagumoodu.

7) St. Aloysius Library, Mulagumoodu.

8) Infant Jesus Arts and Science College for women, Mulagumoodu

9) St.Mary's International School (ICSE)

10. Sigaram Academy of Excellence

Religious sites
Mulagumoodu includes many religious worship centres, churches and temples.

References 

Cities and towns in Kanyakumari district